Brian Thomas Reidy (27 January 1939 – 2 June 2016) was a New Zealand rugby league player who represented New Zealand.

Playing career
Reidy played for the Marist club and represented Auckland. He made his debut for the New Zealand national rugby league team in 1959, becoming Kiwi #383, but  did not make his test match debut until 1961, against Australia at Carlaw Park. Between 1959 and 1966, Reidy played 65 games for New Zealand, including 19 tests, scoring 34 tries in all. He could play anywhere in the backline, but turned out on the wing in all but one of his test match appearances.

Later years
Reidy went on serve as an administrator, on the NZ Kiwis Association, the Auckland Leagues Club and the board of the New Zealand Rugby League Museum. In 2015 he was made a life member of the New Zealand Rugby League.

Reidy died in Auckland on 2 June 2016.

References

1939 births
2016 deaths
New Zealand rugby league players
New Zealand national rugby league team players
Auckland rugby league team players
Marist Saints players
Rugby league wingers